Power forward is a position or role in some team sports:

 Power forward (basketball)
 Power forward (Australian rules football)
 Power forward (ice hockey)